William Brownell Goodwin (October 7, 1866 – May 17, 1950) was an American football player and coach, track and field athlete, insurance executive, and archeologist. He played college football at Yale University in 1884 and was a member of Yale's track and field team in 1886 and 1887. Goodwin served as the first head football coach at the University of Washington, coaching from 1892 to 1893 and compiling a record of 2–4–1. Goodwin officiated the first transcontinental football game, played on December 25, 1899 in San Francisco between California and Carlisle.

Goodwin worked as an agent for the Aetna Fire Insurance Company in Columbus, Ohio and San Francisco before retiring around 1930. He thereafter took up an interest in archeology, making field trips in New England. In North Salem, Massachusetts he discovered a number of colonies of beehive huts similar to those built by Culdees of Northern Ireland. His discovery led him to theorize that the Irish had discovered America. Goodwin died on May 17, 1950, in Hot Springs, Virginia.

Head coaching record

References

1866 births
1950 deaths
19th-century players of American football
20th-century American archaeologists
American businesspeople in insurance
College football officials
Washington Huskies football coaches
Yale Bulldogs football players
Yale Bulldogs men's track and field athletes
Sportspeople from Hartford, Connecticut
Players of American football from Hartford, Connecticut